Amii is a studio album by Amii Stewart released in 1986 which includes singles "Love Ain't No Toy" (originally recorded by Yvonne Fair) and "Time Is Tight". The album was produced by Giorgio Moroder and Dutch brothers Bolland & Bolland for Teldec Germany and RCA Italy.

Track listing 

Side A
 "Time is Tight" (Giorgio Moroder, Keith Forsey) (4:13)
 "Power Play" (Moroder, Forsey) (3:49)
 "Easy on Your Love" (Moroder, Tom Whitlock) (3:27)
 "Love's in Disguise" (Moroder, Forsey) (3:35)
 "Lover to Lover" (Beppe Cantarelli, Roy Freeland) (4:16)

Side B
 "Break These Chains" (Bolland & Bolland) (4:35)
 "Love Ain't No Toy" (Norman Whitfield) (4:59)
 "The Mystery of Love" (Bolland & Bolland) (5:15)
 "Conspiracy" (Bolland & Bolland) (3:59)
 "This Generation" (Bolland & Bolland) (4:38)

Personnel 
 Amii Stewart - lead vocals

Tracks A1-A5 
 Richie Zito- guitar, keyboards
 Arthur Barrow- keyboards, bass
 Beth Anderson, Gary Falcone, Joe Pizzulo- backing vocals
 Terry Wilson- guitar (Track A5)

Tracks B1-B5

Musicians 
 Lex Bolderdijk
 Ferdi Bolland
 Rob Bolland
 Jan Hollestelle
 Ton Op 'T Hof
 Gerbrand Westveen
 Louis Van Dijk
 Okkie Huysdens

Backing Vocals 
 Amii Stewart
 Ferdi Bolland
 Rob Bolland
 Lisa Boray
 Sue Chaloner

Production 
 Giorgio Moroder - producer (Tracks A1-A5)
 Ferdi Bolland - producer (Tracks B1-B5)
 Rob Bolland - producer (Tracks B1-B5)

References 

1986 albums
Amii Stewart albums
Albums produced by Giorgio Moroder